Chae Jong-hyeop (born May 19, 1993) is a South Korean actor. He is known for his role in television series Webtoon Hero - Tundra Show Season 2  (2016), Hot Stove League (2019), Sisyphus: The Myth and Nevertheless (2021). In addition, he is known for his role in web series The Witch's Diner (2021).

Career 
Chae made his debut with MBC every1 drama Webtoon Hero - Tundra Show Season 2  which appeared a little.

In 2017, Chae made his debut through web dramas Between Friends and No Bad Days.

In 2018, Chae joined the web drama No Bad Days Season 2.

In 2019, Chae joined the web drama Rumor.

In 2019–2020, Chae made his debut through the SBS successful sport-themed drama Hot Stove League as a baseball pitcher named "Yoo Min-ho". Hot Stove League gained high viewership rating throughout its run, therefore he gained a lot of public recognition through this drama.

In April 2021, Chae joined the JTBC drama Sisyphus: The Myth with Cho Seung-woo and Park Shin-hye and brought him attention. Later in June, he appeared in the JTBC drama Nevertheless along with Song Kang and Han So-hee. In July, he appeared in TVING's original drama The Witch's Diner with Song Ji-hyo and Nam Ji-hyun.

In 2022, Chae acted in Love All Play and appeared in a cameo appearance in Sh**ting Stars.

In 2022–2023, Chae acted in Unlock My Boss, Is It Fate? and Diva of the Deserted Island as the lead actor.

Personal life

Military service 
In January 2023, Chae interviewed the media, saying he was exempt from mandatory military service. Chae was judged to be a 4th-grade supplementary service (social service agent) in his first physical examination and was finally judged to be a 5th-grade wartime worker in a re-examination in 2018. At the time of his re-physical examination, he even did an EEG test and honestly explained that he had been diagnosed with epilepsy.  

Currently, Chae is treating epilepsy by taking medication, He has been taking epilepsy medicine for 10 years.

Filmography

Television series

Web series

Awards and nominations

References

External links
 
 
 

1993 births
Living people
21st-century South Korean male actors
South Korean male models
South Korean male television actors
South Korean male web series actors